Desaru (Jawi: ديسارو) is a beach resort in Kota Tinggi District, Johor, Malaysia. It is famous for its pristine beach beside the South China Sea. Sea food paradise. Recently also became a popular camping spot.

Economy
Currently, the Johor state government is developing an integrated tourism area which spreads over an area of 1,578 hectares.

Education
The area has various Malaysian boarding schools including Sekolah Menengah Sains Kota Tinggi, Sekolah Sukan Bandar Penawar and Sekolah Menengah Kebangsaan Agama Bandar Penawar.

Shopping
SKS City Mall opened in 2017.

Transportation
Car and motorcycle is the fastest way to go to Desaru. The Senai–Desaru Expressway connects Desaru to Senai within 45 minutes. From Kluang to Desaru about 2-3 hours drive. From JB Taman Mount Austin area takes around 30-40 minutes.

Resident areas
Bandar Penawar
Taman Sri Penawar
Taman Desaru Utama
Taman Mutiara Desaru
Escadia
Harmonia 1
Harmonia 2

References

External links

 Tourism Malaysia - Desaru
 Tourism Malaysia - Desaru Beach
 Greater Desaru Tourism Association
 Desaru Network
 Desaru Coast Malaysia

Kota Tinggi District
Towns in Johor